The Journal of Emergency Medicine is a monthly peer-reviewed medical journal covering emergency medicine. It is the official journal of the American Academy of Emergency Medicine. The editor-in-chief is Stephen Hayden (University of California, San Diego). The founding editor was Peter Rosen and it is published by Elsevier. It was established in 1983 and originally published by Pergamon Press. The journal is often referred to by its acronym, JEM.

Abstracting and indexing 
The journal is abstracted and indexed in:

According to the Journal Citation Reports, the journal has a 2013 impact factor of 1.175, ranking it 12th out of 25 journals in the category "Emergency Medicine".

References

External links 

American Academy of Emergency Medicine

Emergency medicine journals
Elsevier academic journals
Publications established in 1983
English-language journals
Monthly journals